Lieutenant-Colonel George Taylor Denison III Armory, commonly known as Denison Armory, is a Canadian Armed Forces facility located at 1 Yukon Lane in Toronto, Ontario, Canada. It is in the northeastern corner of Downsview Airport, just west of the W.R. Allen Expressway (Allen Road) on Sheppard Avenue West.

Denison Armory is the headquarters of 4th Canadian Division (formerly Land Force Central Area), Joint Task Force Central, and the 32 Canadian Brigade Group. It is also home to several units of the brigade. The armoury is named for George Taylor Denison III, a Canadian Militia commander, judge and Toronto alderman.

History 
The current armoury replaced the previous location at Dufferin Street at Highway 401, built in 1961 and demolished in 2003, now site of Costco's Downsview store. After the closure of CFB Toronto, now Toronto/Downsview Airport, the armoury was relocated next to the new site for Land Force Central Area. The closest major intersection is Sheppard Avenue West and Allen Road. Nothing remains of the 1961 armoury, which was built to accept regiments displaced by the demolition of the old Toronto Armories on University Avenue.

Armory
In the Canadian Forces, an Armory is a place where a reserve unit trains, meets, and parades. In addition to the headquarters elements, the armoury also serves as the home to several Primary Reserve units, including the Governor General's Horse Guards, the 32 Combat Engineer Regiment, the Area Support Unit for 32 Canadian Brigade Group, and several cadet corps/squadrons of the Canadian Cadet Movement.

The original armoury was located at 3621 Dufferin Street. Built in 1961 by Page and Steele, the two storey complex was demolished in 2003.

See also
 Moss Park Armoury
 Dalton Armoury
 Oakville Armoury
 Col J.R. Barber Armoury
List of Armouries in Canada

References

Armouries in Canada
Buildings and structures in Toronto

Governor General's Horse Guards